Ctenopleuron is an extinct genus of jawless fish in the class Anaspida.

References

External links 
 

Birkeniiformes genera
Fossil taxa described in 1907